Simon Apple is an American progressive rock band based in Philadelphia, Pennsylvania.

History

Early years
The band was formed in late 1987 in the Reading, Pennsylvania area (outside of Philadelphia) as a cover band playing music of Genesis, Rush, Electric Light Orchestra, Supertramp, Steely Dan, Pink Floyd, Kansas, Billy Joel, Elton John, Marillion, Level 42, Earth Wind & Fire, Bruce Hornsby, Toto, etc. The original line-up included Jeff Miller (keyboards), Buzz Saylor (drums), Mark Ludwig (guitar), Kurt Manderbach (bass), Brad Weisman (vocals). The band also incorporated a 3-piece horn section on select gigs (Dave Miller – sax, Harry Stevenson – trumpet, Lou Zanine – trombone). The band later went through a few personnel changes that included Alisa Anderson (vocals), Warren Daugherty (bass) replacing Weisman & Manderbach. At the time, the horn section was dropped, but Dave Miller remained on sax as a feature on many Pink Floyd and Supertramp songs.

1992–1995
Saylor and Miller decided to stop performing as a cover band and pursue their own songs. The band invited guitarist Eric Beebe to join. The band became a 3-piece, with additional players live, adding Stefon Pizzuto on bass, and Kevin Checket on drums. Saylor became the lead vocalist at this time.

1996–1999
John Feldmann took over as lead vocalist and live guitarist. Jeff Miller performed guitar in addition to keyboards in studio on From The Toybox. Saylor went back to the drum seat. Beebe and Checket had departed. Pizzuto remained in the live band.
In early 1998 Simon Apple independently released their first single "It's Over", taken from their debut CD From The Toybox.

2000–2007
Feldmann left the band due to family commitments. Miller and Saylor invited Dan Merrill from Portland, Maine, to join the band. Writing and production then began on what would become River to the Sea.

The 2004 album release, River to the Sea, featured several Grammy-winning and multi-platinum guest artists, including Buck Dharma of Blue Oyster Cult, John Helliwell of Supertramp, Steve Rodby of the Pat Metheny Group, Hugh McDowell of Electric Light Orchestra, Tony Levin of King Crimson, Peter Gabriel.

The first single released from "River to the Sea" was "Hold Me [Like A Lover]", which peaked at #10 on the U.S. Adult Contemporary FMBQ radio chart.≈≈≈≈

Discography

Albums
 From The Toybox (1998)
 Apples to Apples, Dust to Dust...Archives (2000)
 River to the Sea (2004)
 River to the Sea Bonus Tracks 2 CD Set (2004)
 Apples to Apples, Dust to Dust...Archives (Remastered 2005)
 River to the Sea (2004)
 Official Bootleg 1 (2005)
 Official Bootleg 2 (2005)
 Official Bootleg 3 (2013)

EPs
 Spot the Looney (1988)
 Simon Apple (1993)

Member solo albums
Dan Merrill
 Revolution (1996)
 Tomorrow to Yesterday (2008)

External links

Interview with Jeff Miller
CD review From the Toybox
CD review River to the Sea

Musical groups from Philadelphia
Progressive rock musical groups from Pennsylvania